Álberto González Cespedosa (born 23 July 1996) is a Spanish footballer who plays for SD Almazán as a goalkeeper.

Club career
Born in Córdoba, Andalusia, González finished his formation with Club Figueroa. In 2015, he moved to CD Ciudad de Lucena in the regional leagues; initially a backup to Miguel Díaz, he made his senior debut on 13 December of that year, starting in a 1–2 Primera Andaluza home loss against CD Pozoblanco.

González renewed his contract with the club ahead of the 2016–17 season, being a first-choice option and achieving promotion to Tercera División. On 20 June 2017, he signed for Córdoba CF and was assigned to the reserves in Segunda División B.

In August 2018, after the departures of Igor Stefanović and Paweł Kieszek, González was promoted to the first-team as a third-choice behind Carlos Abad and Marcos Lavín. On 22 September, as Carlos was ruled out due to his loan contract and Lavín was injured, he made his professional debut by starting in a 1–1 home draw against CD Tenerife in the Segunda División championship.

On 6 August 2019, González signed for CD Mirandés, newly promoted to the second division. After appearing exclusively for the B-team, he moved to Tercera División RFEF side SD Almazán on 22 July 2021.

References

External links

1996 births
Living people
Footballers from Córdoba, Spain
Spanish footballers
Association football goalkeepers
Segunda División players
Segunda División B players
Tercera División players
Divisiones Regionales de Fútbol players
Córdoba CF B players
Córdoba CF players
CD Mirandés B players